Can't Stop Eating may refer to:

 Can't Stop Eating (EP), a 2002 EP by Starflyer 59
 Can't Stop Eating (film), a 2006 documentary film